Paul Wallace is an international swimmer who represented United States during the World Championships in the year 1986. He also won the first prize in Men's 4*100 m freestyle. Paul along with his other companions set a new World record of 3 min 17.08 seconds in 4*100 m relay. He also qualified Nationals swimming qualifier 2003 (50-meter free), USA. He became a member of the USA Swimming Task force.

References 

Year of birth missing (living people)
Living people
American male freestyle swimmers
World Aquatics Championships medalists in swimming
Swimmers at the 1987 Pan American Games
Medalists at the 1987 Pan American Games
Pan American Games silver medalists for the United States
Pan American Games medalists in swimming